René Pilato (born 31 August 1962) is a French politician. He is a member of La France Insoumise and the deputy for Charente's 1st constituency.

Personal life
Pilato is a former math teacher. He has two children.

References

Living people
1962 births
21st-century French politicians
La France Insoumise politicians
Deputies of the 16th National Assembly of the French Fifth Republic